Mike Gillespie may refer to:
Mike Gillespie (baseball) (1940–2020), American baseball coach
Mike Gillespie (basketball) (born 1951), American basketball coach

See also
Michael Allen Gillespie, American political science and philosophy professor